Euseius unisetus is a species of mite in the family Phytoseiidae.

References

unisetus
Articles created by Qbugbot
Animals described in 1983